Empress Tudan may refer to:
 
Empress Tudan (Digunai's wife) (died 1170), wife of Digunai (Wanyan Liang)
Princess Consort Shao of Wei (1168–?), wife of Wanyan Yongji

Tudan